Plewiska  is a village in the administrative district of Gmina Komorniki, within Poznań County, Greater Poland Voivodeship, in west-central Poland. Poznań's city boundary runs between the village and a neighbourhood – also called Plewiska – in the Grunwald district of the city.

The village has a population of 5,867.
At Plewiska, there is an important 400 kV/220 kV/110 kV electrical substation.

Culture 
 Komorniki Festival of Organ and Chamber Music
 Chopin: Desire for Love

References

External links
 Official website Gmina Komorniki
 Komorniki Festival of Organ and Chamber Music

Villages in Poznań County
Neighbourhoods of Poznań